Cecilie Risøe (born 13 August 1952) is a Norwegian physician and cardiologist.

She was President of the Norwegian Society of Cardiology from 2005 to 2009 and is Chairman of the Norwegian Council on Cardiovascular Diseases. She was a member of the executive board of the Norwegian Medical Association from 2008 to 2013. She is a senior consultant cardiologist at Oslo University Hospital, Rikshospitalet.

She earned her MD at the University of Oslo in 1980 and her Med.Sc.D. on heart failure at the same university in 1991.

She is married to the neurosurgeon Ole Jørgen Kirkeby.

References

1952 births
Living people
University of Oslo alumni
Norwegian cardiologists
Norwegian women physicians
Oslo University Hospital people
20th-century Norwegian physicians
21st-century Norwegian physicians
20th-century women physicians
21st-century women physicians
20th-century Norwegian women